The Franklin Lock and Dam, also known as the W.P. Franklin Lock and Dam, is a navigable lock and dam in Olga, Florida, United States.

This lock and dam cost $3.8 million, and was constructed in 1965. The Franklin Lock and Dam was named after Walter P. Franklin (1871-1967), a businessman, civic leader, and mayor of Fort Myers, Florida.  

Lockage usually takes between 15 and 20 minutes. The lock operates from 7 am to 5 pm, 365 days a year, unless otherwise stated in "Notice to Mariners", published by the Coast Guard.

Purpose
The Franklin Lock and Dam were constructed for flood control, water control, the prevention of salt-water intrusion, and for navigation purposes.

Technical information

The lock chamber is concrete, with welded structural steel sector gates, and concrete gate bays.

Lockage

Vessels
Approximately 15,000 vessels pass through annually, of which about 97% are recreational vessels.

Commodities
About 13,000 tons of manufactured goods, equipment, crude materials, food, and petroleum 
products are locked annually.

Radio channel
This lock operates on Marine VHF radio channel 13.

See also
List of reservoirs and dams in Florida

References

Transportation buildings and structures in Lee County, Florida
Dams in Florida
United States Army Corps of Engineers dams
Transport infrastructure completed in 1965
Dams completed in 1965
1965 establishments in Florida
Locks of Florida
Buildings and structures in Lee County, Florida